Pema ( or ) is a Tibetan name meaning "lotus", which originated as a loanword from Sanskrit padma. People who have this name as one of their given names include:

Buddhist teachers and leaders
Pema Lingpa (1450–1521), Bhutanese saint
Nyala Pema Dündul (1816–1872), teacher of Dzogchen and Tantric Buddhism in Eastern Tibet
Pema Trinle (1874–1950), teacher of the Sakya tradition
Gomchen Pema Chewang Tamang (1918–1966), Sikkimese Buddhist scholar
Pema Chödrön (born Deirdre Blomfield-Brown, 1936), American nun
Pema Tönyö Nyinje (born 1954), the 12th Tai Situpa
Jigmet Pema Wangchen (born 1963), the 12th Gyalwang Drukpa

Royalty
Tsundue Pema Lhamo (1886–1922), first queen consort of Bhutan
Pema Dechen (1918–1991), third queen consort of Bhutan
Jetsun Pema (born 1990), queen consort of Bhutan since 2011

Sportspeople
Pema Tshering (born 1951), Bhutanese arche
Pema Chophel (born 1981), Bhutanese footballer
Pema Dorji (footballer) (born 1985), Bhutanese footballer
Pema Rinchen (born 1986), Bhutanese footballer
Pema Diki Sherpa (born 1988), Nepalese mountain climber

Other
Pema Dorji (doctor) (1936–2009), practitioner of traditional Bhutanese medicine
Jetsun Pema (born 1940), sister of the 14th Dalai Lama
Pema Dhondup, Nepalese film director
Pema Tseden (born 1969), Chinese film director
Pema Dakpa (born ), Bhutanese politician
Pema Khandu (born 1979), Indian politician, Chief Minister of Arunachal Pradesh

See also
Padma (disambiguation)

References

Tibetan names